Zuma Beach is a county beach at 30000 Pacific Coast Highway (PCH) in Malibu, California. One of the largest and most popular beaches in Los Angeles County, California, it is known for its long, wide sands and excellent surf. It consistently ranks among the healthiest beaches for clean water conditions in Los Angeles County.

History
The beach's name may be related to the origin of the name of the nearby promontory, Point Dume, named by George Vancouver in 1793 in honor of Padre Francisco Dumetz of Mission San Buenaventura. The name was misspelled on Vancouver's map as "Dume" and was never corrected. On a plat map of the Rancho Topanga Malibu Sequit finally confirmed to new owner Matthew Keller in August 1870, the point is marked on the map as "Point Zuma or Duma".

Features

Zuma is protected by the Lifeguard unit of the Los Angeles County Fire Department, with 14 lifeguard towers on the sands proper and one of four L.A. County Section Headquarters located at the center of the beach.

Like all beaches with good surf, Zuma has its share of rip currents. Visitors are encouraged not to swim or surf in front of the Lifeguard Headquarters between Towers 8 and 9, an area particularly prone to rip currents. In fact, rip currents are so prevalent that as of 2007 the Los Angeles County Fire Department Lifeguard Unit uses Zuma Beach to illustrate a rip current.

Zuma Beach hosts several premier surfing events each year.  With optimum wind conditions nearly daily in the late afternoon, Zuma draws many to kitesurfing on the northern end of Zuma Beach.

Zuma Beach can be accessed directly from PCH, and lies between the major access corridors Las Virgenes/Malibu Canyon Road and Kanan-Dume Road to the southeast, and Las Posas Road to the northwest. Parking is available in a large fee parking lot. Additional parking is available on the adjacent PCH.

On its southeast side, Zuma is bordered by Westward Beach. Westward is geographically situated on Malibu's westernmost promontory known as Point Dume. Westward includes a stretch of 2-way road right at the sand's edge.  Parking is available on the road as well as a fee parking lot. Westward Beach is marked by a shorter sand shelf than Zuma, a veritable pipeline, making the waves of less duration and higher impact. Westward Beach is recommended only for strong swimmers, as the wave action compared to Zuma Beach is stronger, can push down on swimmers, and delivers more of a "crunch."  Westward Beach is where former lifeguard Jesse Billauer suffered the accident that left him paralyzed.

Facilities
Beach Volleyball courts (Pepperdine Waves beach volleyball)
Bodyboarding
Bodysurfing
Diving (shallow)
Fishing
Food stands, seasonal
Kiteboarding
Outdoor showers (cold)
Parking lot
Restrooms
Surfing
Swimming; lifeguard on duty during daylight hours
Walkway (wheelchair accessible)
Windsurfing

Parking: 2025 spaces (43 disabled)
Electric Vehicle - 3 inductive, 1 conductive

Emergency use
During emergency conditions such as fires, mudslides or earthquakes, Zuma Beach is a designated emergency evacuation center. With its flat terrain, open parking, miles of pristine sand, and xeriscape landscaping, it is an optimal first-response open-air shelter. It has a dedicated helicopter landing area for medical emergency airlifts to trauma centers.

Film location 
With its proximity to the film and television industry in Los Angeles, Zuma Beach has been a popular filming location.

 Films
 Planet of the Apes (1968)—the final scenes were filmed on Zuma Beach near Point Dume and at Pirate's Cove Beach to the southwest.
 Zuma Beach (1978)—a television film directed by Lee H. Katzin
 The final beach scene and the transitional image of a wave crashing against a rock in Barton Fink (1991) by the Coen brothers was shot at Zuma Beach.
 Indecent Proposal (1993)—directed by Adrian Lyne

 Television
 I Dream of Jeannie (1965–1970)—as "a deserted island in the South Pacific" when Capt. Tony Nelson discovers Jeannie in the first episode
 Baywatch (1989–2001)—a frequently used site for the television series
 America's Next Top Model (2003–2015)—the location for a challenge commercial (cycle 22, 2015)
 Scorpion (2014–2018)—a location in Season 1, episode 12

Events
The Malibu Nautica Triathlon is an annual benefit for Children's Hospital of Los Angeles. The swim portion begins at Zuma Beach, followed by a bicycle segment along the length of the beach north to Deer Creek Canyon, capped by a run along the sidewalk fronting Zuma Beach. In its 34th year as of 2008, the event draws competitors from around the world, but is best known in popular culture for the Hollywood celebrities and retired Olympic medalists who compete. Stars in recent Nauticas have been David Duchovny, Felicity Huffman, Carl Lewis, Jennifer Lopez, William H. Macy, and Matthew McConaughey. Many television stars also have competed. In 2008, the event raised nearly $980,000.

References

External links
 

 Zuma Beach at Citysearch

Malibu, California
Parks in Los Angeles County, California
Santa Monica Mountains
Surfing locations in California
Beaches of Los Angeles County, California
Tourist attractions in Malibu, California
Beach volleyball venues in the United States
College beach volleyball venues in the United States
Pepperdine Waves women's beach volleyball venues
Volleyball venues in California